A total solar eclipse occurred on August 12, 1673. A solar eclipse occurs when the Moon passes between Earth and the Sun, thereby totally or partly obscuring the image of the Sun for a viewer on Earth. A total solar eclipse occurs when the Moon's apparent diameter is larger than the Sun's, blocking all direct sunlight, turning day into darkness. Totality occurs in a narrow path across Earth's surface, with the partial solar eclipse visible over a surrounding region thousands of kilometres wide.

Description
The eclipse was visible in nearly all of Africa (with the exception of a part of what is now southern Namibia and southern South Africa), southern Europe, parts of the Middle East and other parts of Asia, Mysore, Maldives, Ceylon (now Sri Lanka), Sumatra and western Java as well as a part of the middle Atlantic and most of the Indian Ocean. It was part of solar saros 130.

The umbral portion which was as far as 242 km, it included areas that were 50 miles (90–100 km) south of the islands of Santiago and Maio in Cape Verde, Senegambia including the kingdoms of Sine and Saloum, Mali, Songhai (or Songhay), Wadai, Darfur, a part of what is Sudan and the South Sudan and Ethiopia. The greatest occurred at 4.6 N, 40.6 E near the Dawa River in Ethiopia not far from the present day border with Kenya at 9:04 UTC (1:04 PM local time) and lasted for over 6 minutes.

The eclipse showed up to 40% obscuration in Europe and 75% in Yemen in the Middle East, areas that showed up to 50% obscuration included Spanish controlled Canary Islands Morocco, Ottoman Algeris, Tunis, Libya and Egypt and near Oman and on the other side present-day Gabon, the Congo Basin, Malawi, present-day northern Mozambique and southern Madagascar. On Madagascar, it showed from 40% in the south to nearly 80% obscuration in the north. In Madeira, it showed around 30–35% obscuration, 90–95% obscuration in parts of Cape Verde, around 55% in Socotra, 85–90% in the Mascarene Islands and about 25% in the Chagos Archipelago.  Areas that were on the rim of the eclipse included the area of the Azores, France including Brittany, the Alps, Ottoman Moldavia and Armenia, Persia (now Iran), Mysore and Sumatra and very close to Antarctica.

The eclipse started at sunrise off Cape Verde, the umbral path went southeast and finished as sunset off the coast of Australia (called[New Holland at the time).

The subsolar marking was at Yemen in the area at the time that divided the Ottoman Empire.

See also 
 List of solar eclipses in the 17th century
 List of solar eclipses visible from Cape Verde

References

External links 
 Google interactive maps
 Solar eclipse data

1673 08 12
1673 in science
1673 08 12
August events